Lee Ravon "Buck" Ross (February 3, 1915 – November 23, 1978) was an American professional baseball pitcher. He played in Major League Baseball (MLB) from 1936 to 1945 for the Philadelphia Athletics and Chicago White Sox. Ross was born in Norwood, North Carolina.

External links

1915 births
1978 deaths
Major League Baseball pitchers
Baseball players from North Carolina
Chicago White Sox players
Philadelphia Athletics players
People from Norwood, North Carolina
Kannapolis Towelers players